This is a list of cities in French Guiana:

Villages

 Acarouany
 Alikoto Tapele
 Antecume Pata
 Apatou
 Awala-Yalimapo
 Balata
 Balaté
 Bélizon
 Bellevue
 Boniville
 Cacao
 Camopi
 Cayenne
 Charvein
 Clément
 Cormotibo
 Coulor
 Délices
 Élahé
 Espérance
 Grand Santi
 Guisanbourg
 Île Portal
 Iracoubo
 Javouhey
 Kaw or Caux
 Kourou
 Kulumuli
 Macouria
 Malmanoury
 Mana
 Maripasoula
 Matoury
 Montsinéry
 Nouveau Wakapou
 Ouanary
 Paul Isnard
 Pilima
 Pointe Isère
 Providence
 Résidence Arc-en-ciel
 Régina
 Rémire
 Rochambeau
 Roura
 Saint-Nazaire
 Sainte-Rose-de-Lima
 Saül
 Sinnamary
 St-Élie
 St Georges de l'Oyapock
 St-Jean
 St-Laurent du Maroni
 Talhuwen
 Tonate
 Tonnegrande
 Trois-Palétuviers
 Trois Sauts
 Trou Poisson

See also
 Communes of the Guyane département